Robert Anthony Gamez (born July 21, 1968) is an American professional golfer who currently plays on the PGA Tour.

Gamez was born in Las Vegas, and is of Mexican descent. He attended the University of Arizona where he was a member of the golf team. He played on the 1989 Walker Cup Team and dropped out of university to turn professional later that same year.

Gamez has had what can be described as a hot and cold career as a professional golfer. He started out winning two tournaments in his rookie season on the Tour, including his first event, the Northern Telecom Tucson Open. Only three others: Marty Fleckman in 1967, Ben Crenshaw in 1973, and Garrett Willis in 2001, have won their first PGA Tour event as a member of the PGA Tour. He is possibly best known for holing his second shot from the fairway on the tough 18th hole in the final round at the Nestle Invitational in March 1990, giving him a one stroke win over Greg Norman.

From 1991 to 1997, Gamez had six runner-up finishes and one third place finish on the PGA Tour. In 1998, Gamez was injured in a car accident at the Kemper Open and his career started to decline. Between 1998 and 2001, he failed to finish in the top 125 on the PGA Tour money list. His career hit a low point in 2001, when he failed to qualify for the Tour. Then he began to enjoy a resurgence in his career. He finished in the top-125 every year between 2002–2005 including a T-5 at the Bank of America Colonial in 2004 and a win at the 2005 Valero Texas Open. It was his first win in 15 years, 6 months (394 events), a PGA Tour record. His best finish in a major is T-12 at the 1990 Open Championship.

Gamez hosts an annual tournament in Orlando, Florida for the benefit of the Team Gamez Foundation. He lives in Orlando, Florida. He has not played a full season on any tour since 2008.

Amateur wins (3)
1985 Southern Nevada Amateur
1988 Clark County Amateur
1989 Porter Cup

Professional wins (5)

PGA Tour wins (3)

PGA Tour playoff record (0–1)

Japan Golf Tour wins (1)

Other wins (1)

Other playoff record (0–1)

Results in major championships

CUT = missed the half-way cut
"T" = tied

Summary

Most consecutive cuts made – 3 (1990 U.S. Open – 1990 PGA)
Longest streak of top-10s – 0

Results in The Players Championship

CUT = missed the halfway cut
"T" indicates a tie for a place

Results in World Golf Championships

"T" = Tied

U.S. national team appearances
Amateur
Walker Cup: 1989

See also 

 1989 PGA Tour Qualifying School graduates

References

External links

American male golfers
Arizona Wildcats men's golfers
PGA Tour golfers
Golfers from Orlando, Florida
Golfers from Nevada
American sportspeople of Mexican descent
Sportspeople from the Las Vegas Valley
1968 births
Living people